The 2141 class was a class of diesel locomotives built by Clyde Engineering, Eagle Farm for Queensland Railways in 1973.

History
The 2141 class were an evolution of the 2100 class. They differed by having AC alternators instead of DC generators. They were financed by the developers of the Greenvale nickel mine and were initially confined to the  Townsville to Greenvale line. They were initially numbered as the 2200 class, before being renumbered as the 2141 class in May 1982 to make the series available for the 2170 class.

Between 2005 and 2007, all were rebuilt as 2250 class locomotives.

References

Clyde Engineering locomotives
Co-Co locomotives
Diesel locomotives of Queensland
Queensland Rail locomotives
Railway locomotives introduced in 1973
Diesel-electric locomotives of Australia
3 ft 6 in gauge locomotives of Australia